The   was a trunk Roman road in the north Italian plain, running from Ariminum (Rimini), on the Adriatic coast, to Placentia (Piacenza) on the river Padus (Po). It was completed in 187 BC. The Via Aemilia connected at Rimini with the Via Flaminia, which had been completed 33 years earlier, to Rome.

History 

The land today known as northern Italy (Italia settentrionale) was known to the ancient Romans during the republican period (to 44 BC) as Gallia Cisalpina (literally: Gaul on the near – i.e. southern – side of the Alps) because it was then inhabited by Celtic tribes from Gaul, who had colonised the area in the 4th and 5th centuries BC.

Italia meant the area inhabited by Italic tribes: the border between Italia and Gallia Cisalpina was roughly a line between Pisae (Pisa) and Ariminum.
Gallia Cisalpina contained the Pianura padana (Po river plain).

This vast country, by far the largest fertile plain in the mountainous peninsula, contained potentially its best agricultural land, and offered the Romans the opportunity to expand enormously their population and economic resources by mass colonisation.

The Romans subjugated the Gauls of the Pianura Padana in a series of hard-fought campaigns in the late 3rd century BC. 

By 220 BC, the Via Flaminia was completed, providing the Romans with ready access to the region. However, Roman expansion was delayed for some twenty years by the Second Punic War. During the Carthaginian general Hannibal's  invasion of Italy (218 BC–203 BC), Roman military control of the Pianura Padana was temporarily overthrown. Many of the recently defeated tribes (such as the Insubres and the Boii) rebelled and joined forces with Hannibal in the hope of regaining their independence. 

It was not until 189 BC that the rebel tribes had been pacified sufficiently to allow work on the Via Aemilia to begin.

The time-tested Roman method of expansion was to build a brand new road straight through the newly conquered territory, and then establish a string of colonies, either of civilian settlers or of military veterans along its route. 

The settlers would be allocated fertile plots from lands confiscated from the defeated native peoples. This was the precise function of the Via Aemilia: its period of construction also saw the foundation of Roman colonies along its whole length at Bononia (Bologna) (founded 189 BC), Mutina (Modena), Regium (Reggio Emilia), and Parma (all founded in 183 BC).

The Via Aemilia was completed by, and named after, the Roman consul Marcus Aemilius Lepidus in 187 BC. It ran, largely in a straight line, 176 Roman miles (260 km) NW from Rimini to its termination at Piacenza, passing through the cities of Forlì, Faenza, Bologna, Modena, Reggio, and Parma.

The road ran along the southern edge of the flat Pianura Padana within sight of the northern foothills of Italy's Apennine mountains, crossing numerous tributary rivers of the Po, notably the Rubicone near Rimini — although it is not certain that this river is the same as the famous Rubicon crossed by Julius Caesar in 49 BC—and the river Trebbia near Piacenza, site of the first of Hannibal's three major victories over the Romans during his invasion of Italy.

In the century following the construction of the Via Aemilia, Piacenza became the key Roman road hub in the pianura padana. In 148 BC, the Via Postumia linked Piacenza to Aquileia on the north Adriatic coast.

In 109 BC, the consul Marcus Aemilius Scaurus completed the Via Aemilia Scaura to Genua (Genoa) and Pisae (Pisa).

Remains
At Rimini, the starting point of the Via Aemilia, the road's first bridge still exists, a massive structure spanning the Marecchia River, started by the Emperor Augustus and completed by his successor Tiberius. It still bears its twin dedicatory inscriptions. 

At Bologna, milestone 78 was found in the bed of the river Reno. It records Augustus' reconstruction of the Aemilia, in 2 BC, from Rimini as far as the river Trebbia. Remains of the Aemilia bridge over the Reno were found in the 1890s, consisting of parts of the parapets from each side. These were originally 38.75 feet apart, of Veronese red marble. 

The bed of the river was found to have risen at least 20 feet since this bridge collapsed in the 9th century. Ruins of some of the other ancient Roman bridges still exist. 

At Savignano sul Rubicone a Roman bridge survived until it was demolished as recently as World War II. The current bridge is a reconstruction.

Legacy

The construction of the Via Aemilia launched the intensive Roman colonisation of the Pianura Padana. The vast agricultural potential of this region soon rendered it the most populous and economically important part of Italy, overshadowing Central Italy, Rome and the South.

The area remains economically preeminent in modern Italy. By the time of the Second Triumvirate (44 BC-30 BC), Romanisation of this formerly Celtic country was so complete that the province of Gallia Cisalpina was abolished and its territory incorporated into the heartland province of Italia.

The road gave its name to that part of Gallia Cisalpina through which it ran. This area was, before the Roman conquest, the territory of the Gallic tribes Boii (who gave their name to the city of Bologna) and Senones. It was already commonly referred to as Aemilia by the time the Emperor Augustus assumed sole power. In around 7 BC, when Augustus divided the provincia of Italia into 11 regiones (administrative districts), the area became the eighth regio. This initially had the official name of Padus, but was later changed to Aemilia.

The western part of this area is still known as Emilia today. The boundaries of the Roman VIII regio roughly corresponded to those of the modern Italian administrative region of Emilia-Romagna. Its inhabitants are today known as Emiliani. The modern Italian State Road 9 is still officially called Via Emilia and follows the Roman route over much of its length. Indeed, the modern road in many parts lies directly above the Roman road.

Bridges 

There are the remains of several Roman bridges along the road, including the Ponte d’Augusto, Ponte di Sant’Arcangelo di Romagna, Ponte San Vito, Ponte sul Reno and Ponte sul Rubicone.

See also 
Roman bridge
Roman engineering

References

External links
LacusCurtius – Via Aemilia (1911 Encyclopædia Britannica Entry)
 Omnes Viae: Via Aemilia on the Peutinger Map

Aemilia, Via
Transport in Emilia-Romagna
180s BC establishments
2nd-century BC establishments in Italy
2nd-century BC establishments in the Roman Republic